Elizabeth Hale may refer to:
 Elizabeth Amherst Hale (1774–1826), Canadian watercolour artist
 Lzzy Hale, American rock musician